The Romanian Basketball Federation (FRB) is the governing body of basketball in Romania. It was founded in 1931, and they became members of FIBA in 1932 as co-founders.

The Romanian Basketball Federation operates the Romanian men's national team and Romanian women's national team. They organize national competitions in Romania, for both the men's and women's senior teams and also the youth national basketball teams.

The top professional league in Romania is Liga Națională.

Presidents

See also 
Romania national basketball team
Romania national under-19 basketball team
Romania national under-17 basketball team
Romania men's national 3x3 team
Romania women's national basketball team
Romania women's national under-19 basketball team
Romania women's national under-17 basketball team
Romania women's national 3x3 team

References

External links 
Official Site 
Romania at Facebook.com
Romania at FIBA site

Basketball in Romania
Basketball
Fed
Basketball governing bodies in Europe
Sports organizations established in 1931